Gençer Cansev (born 4 January 1989) is a Turkish professional footballer who plays as a centre-back for Menemenspor.

Professional career
A youth product of Küçükköyspor, he debuted with the club in the 2007-08 season. He began his early career with Kartalspor, Giresunspor, and Boluspor, before moving to Başakşehir in 2013. He helped them get promoted into the Süper Lig for the 2013–14 season. He made his professional debut for Başakşehir in a 0–0 Süper Lig tie with Konyaspor on 18 October 2014. 

He thereafter moved to Ankaragücü, before moving to Altay in 2018. Altay was promoted into the Süper Lig for the 2020–21 season, although Cansev was unable to play as he suffered two consecutive injuries to his cruciate ligaments.

Honours
Başakşehir
TFF First League: 2013–14

References

External links
 
 

1989 births
People from Akdağmadeni
Living people
Turkish footballers
Turkey youth international footballers
Association football defenders
Kartalspor footballers
Giresunspor footballers
Boluspor footballers
İstanbul Başakşehir F.K. players
Göztepe S.K. footballers
MKE Ankaragücü footballers
Altay S.K. footballers
Menemenspor footballers
Süper Lig players
TFF First League players
TFF Second League players